The Plain is the parade field at the United States Military Academy at West Point, New York. The flat terrain of the Plain is in contrast to the varied and hilly terrain of the remainder of the campus. In its early years, the entire academy was located on the Plain and it was used for varying activities ranging from drill and mounted cavalry maneuvers to an encampment site for summer training to a sports venue. Currently, the Plain refers to just the parade field where cadets perform ceremonial parades.

Geography
It was not always the level and manicured parade ground that is seen today.

History

Before the development of the modern academy, the term "The Plain" referred to the relatively flat geographic area that the current academy occupies.  It included the area where Fort Clinton was constructed.  The term now specifically applies to the parade field.  The Connecticut militia that first occupied West Point on 27 January 1778 encamped there during that particularly harsh winter.  That summer, construction began on Fort Arnold, later to be renamed Fort Clinton, which stood at the far eastern edge of the Plain and overlooked the sharp westerly turn in the Hudson River.  The land was owned by a private citizen, a Mr. Stephen Moore of North Carolina.  Secretary of the Treasury Alexander Hamilton authorized the army's purchase of the land for $11,085 in 1790.
 

In the early days of the academy, the Plain was used for many purposes beyond its current use for ceremonial parades. From its earliest days until just after World War I, the Corps of Cadets spent their summers encamped on the Plain as part of their tactical field training.  Semi-permanent tents were erected, hard-floor planking, and furniture and books were moved out to the campsite as the Cadets moved out of the barracks for the summer.  Cadets practiced military drill and cavalry maneuvers on the Plain's open areas.  However, after the superintendency of Douglas MacArthur from 1919 to 1922, summer camp was no longer held on the Plain.  Before the construction of Michie Stadium, the Army football team played their home games upon the Plain.  For the first 100 years of the academy, there was a large depression on the northern edge of the plain near trophy point.  This area was known locally as Execution Hollow as reportedly military executions occurred there during the Revolutionary War period.  The hollow remained until 1912, when it was filled in with soil excavated from the construction of Bartlett Hall. The area now is a small grassy field between the Superintendent's review stands, Clinton Field, and Battle Monument on Trophy point.  The field contains a small putting green used by the Department of Physical Education for golf instruction and a spruce tree planted in 2009 as a post Christmas tree.

Uses

The Plain in present-day is used primarily for ceremonial parades, known at the academy as "reviews".  Because of the cold weather common at the academy, cadet reviews are usually held between April and November.  Cadets also use the Plain for recreational activities or as a place to retreat from the barracks during the late spring or early fall.  The general public is asked not to walk on the grass Plain. Visitors can access and view the Plain up-close from Diagonal Walk, a walkway which bisects the Plain running north–south from Eisenhower statue to MacArthur statue.  The Plain is also the location of the Corps of Cadets' Tap Vigils when a member of the corps passes away.  Shortly before 2330 hours, the entire corps assembles in silence on the large paved southern edge of the plain, known as the Apron.  The traditional military hymn "Taps" is played, followed by a singing of the "Alma Mater" by the corps, followed by the playing of "Amazing Grace" by the Pipes and Drums. The cadets then disperse in silence back to their rooms.

Monuments
The periphery of the Plain is home to several monuments to past American military leaders.  A horse-mounted George Washington is depicted atop Washington Monument on the western edge looking out over the Plain. World War II Generals of the Army are remembered with Eisenhower Monument and MacArthur Monument, which sit at opposite ends of Diagonal Walk.  In the far north west corner, Thayer Monument commemorates the "Father of the Military Academy", and stands watch over the Plain.  On the far eastern edge of the Plain, just beyond Clinton field, Polish General Tadeusz Kosciuszko looks out over the Hudson River at Kosciuszko's Monument.

Notes

References

Army Black Knights football
1778 establishments in New York (state)
United States Military Academy